Thandiwe Ithandile Sibisi (born 4 November 1986) is a South African art gallery owner and businesswoman. Sibisi is renowned for her cultural activism in South Africa and becoming the first black female to own an art gallery in South Africa at the age of 25.
She was born in rural KZN and is the daughter of farmers. Sibisi initially moved to Johannesburg to study and pursue a modelling career, which she eventually moved away from to start her first business, Invogue Concepts, which she founded at the age of 18. Sibisi now runs several businesses, including an art gallery, Sibisi Gallery, for which she is so widely acclaimed.

Early life and education
Sibisi was born on 4 November 1986 in Estcourt, South Africa to Siphiwo Sibisi and Sizeni MaMncube Sibisi. She is the last born of 9 children. Sibisi grew up in Weenen, a small town well known for its political and tribal conflicts. Sibisi and her family lived in a village named KwaMtebhelu, surrounded by faction fighting. As a 6-year-old Sibisi encountered the brutal murder of 12 men on her front yard. Sibisi and her family moved to Ladysmith when she was 7-years-old to escape the conflict in Weenen.

Sibisi's parents were subsistent farmers of corn and cattle. Sibisi grew up herding cows and tending to the corn fields with her mother, father and siblings. Sibisi credits this time as her best years, and her mother, her best teacher, "she instilled in me a deep profound love for Africa. She told me stories about the history of a glorious continent and taught me to love it and serve it always".

Sibisi studied Business Management at the University of Johannesburg and dropped out after one year to start her own business in marketing. Sibisi inspired by her rural South African roots started Invogue Concepts at the age of 18, with the aim to promote African arts and culture. Her aim was to shine a spotlight on African arts and culture, remind Africans of their intrinsic identity by showcasing it to the world. In 2017, Sibisi enrolled at the University of South Africa to study towards a law degree.

Career
Early in her career Sibisi struggled to get her marketing company to take off. She describes this time as a blessing in disguise, "it was character building. I learned to rely on myself, as I was always alone  the impossible. I am grateful for this time because it taught me humility." At age 22, Sibisi's career began to take off, when she moved to Mahikeng, to consult with various government departments.

While working with the Department of Arts and Culture (South Africa), Sibisi discovered a love for contemporary African art.  During a 6-month hiatus in Paris, France, Sibisi made a resolution to open Sibisi Gallery, a contemporary art gallery specialising in African investment art.

At 25, Sibisi became the first black woman to own an art gallery in South Africa, when she opened Sibisi Gallery at the Melrose Arch in Johannesburg. In 2015, Sibisi reincorporated her company into a holdings company, Sibisi Holdings, a creative agency, hosting under its umbrella several businesses in the creative and art space, gaining valuable founder and investor experience. Sibisi is passionate about local economic development. Sibisi Holdings' main focus is the promotion and accessibility of African arts and culture.

Sibisi is the sole director of Sibisi Holdings, which is set to launch a landmark inaugural event in 2021.

Philanthropy and causes
As a cultural activist, Sibisi uses art to advocate for her philanthropic endeavours and responsibilities, to promote the welfare of rural women and girls in South Africa. Sibisi is the founder and director of the Sibisi Foundation.

The Injusuthi Project is a Sibisi Foundation initiative which documents the stories of Ukuthwala, the act of forcing young women to enter into wedlock as young as 12-years-old. 
Ukuthwala is a cultural practice prevalent in South Africa, especially in KwaZulu Natal and Eastern Cape. Being born around this practice, Sibisi saw how this practice devastated families and young victims and has since sought to create awareness around it.

Although the practice has been integrated into the Traffic of Persons Act in South Africa, it is still rife in rural communities. As a result of this practice, young women lose the opportunity to get an education, they often find themselves having to grow up living with HIV and AIDS, and become victims of gender-based violence. Sibisi Foundation believes that this practice should not exist in a free and fair South Africa.

As an art practitioner Sibisi works closely with artists and crafters at the grassroots level assisting in the development of their skills and creating an art market for the commercialization of their works of art. A big part of that involves sustainable development for female artists and crafters from previously disadvantaged backgrounds.

Personal life
Sibisi is a traditionalist and attributes her beliefs to African spirituality, traditional African religions, to which she advocates.

References

External links
 

South African female models
South African art collectors
Zulu people
1986 births
Living people